The 1978 Georgia Tech Yellow Jackets football team represented the Georgia Institute of Technology during the 1978 NCAA Division I-A football season. The Yellow Jackets were led by fifth-year head coach Pepper Rodgers, and played their home games at Grant Field in Atlanta. The team was invited to the 1978 Peach Bowl, held just three miles from their home stadium in Atlanta, where they lost to Purdue.

On November 11, 1978 at  Air Force Tech running back Eddie Lee Ivery rushed for 356 yards. At the time it set a new record for rushing yards in a game by a player.

Schedule

Sources:

References

Georgia Tech
Georgia Tech Yellow Jackets football seasons
Georgia Tech Yellow Jackets football